Pioneer Building may refer to:

Pioneer Building (San Francisco), listed on the NRHP in San Francisco, California
Pioneer Building of the Pioneer and Endicott Buildings, Saint Paul, Minnesota, listed on the NRHP in Minnesota
Montana Veterans and Pioneers Memorial Building, Helena, Montana, listed on the NRHP in Lewis and Clark County, Montana

Pioneer Building (New Rochelle, New York), listed on the NRHP in Westchester County, New York
Pioneer Building (Oklahoma City, Oklahoma), listed on the NRHP in Oklahoma County, Oklahoma
Pioneer Building (Seattle, Washington), listed on the NRHP in Washington
Pioneer Block, Eau Claire, Wisconsin, listed on the NRHP in Eau Claire County, Wisconsin

See also
Pioneer Hall (disambiguation)
Pioneer Mine Buildings and A Headframe, Ely, Minnesota, listed on the NRHP in St. Louis County, Minnesota
Pioneer Theater-Auditorium, Reno, Nevada, listed on the NRHP in Washoe County, Nevada
Ghirardelli Square, which includes Pioneer Woolen Mills and D. Ghirardelli Company, San Francisco CA, listed on the NRHP in San Francisco, California

Architectural disambiguation pages